The 1998 CPSL League Cup was the inaugural edition of the Canadian Professional Soccer League's league cup tournament running from July through late September. The tournament final was played in a two-game series final at Club Roma Stadium in St. Catharines, Ontario, and at Birchmount Stadium in Toronto, Ontario. The tournament was won by the Toronto Olympians after defeating St. Catharines Roma Wolves 3-0 on goals on aggregate.

Overview  
After proposals made in 1996 by the USL A-League to create an open cup competition within Canada failed to materialize the newly formed Canadian Professional Soccer League launched the CPSL League Cup in 1998 as the successor league cup to the Canadian National Soccer League's. Though initially the tournament was restricted to CPSL member clubs plans were formulated for future participation of USL A-League Canadian franchises and the champions of the various top provincial leagues.  Eventually the league's objective would be reached in the 2003 Open Canada Cup as the tournament officially became open to all Canadian professional and amateur clubs in order to provide a potential candidate for the CONCACAF Champions' Cup. The original format of the tournament was organized into a group stage with the two top teams advancing to the semifinals.

Group stage

Group A

Group B

Semi-finals

St. Catharines won 6–1 on aggregate.

Toronto won 9–1 on aggregate.

Finals

Toronto won 3–0 on aggregate.

References 

CPSL League Cup
CPSL League Cup
CPSL League Cup